Anna Stadling (born 11 July 1970 in Sundsvall, Sweden) is a Swedish musical artist. She contributes with background vocals and plays the guitar in the band Hovet. She has also played with Staffan Hellstrand and worked together with Idde Schultz. She has scored various successes at the Swedish charts.

Discography

Solo
1999 – Det känns
2010 – E4 mot norr
2013 – Stadling/Cash (Anna Stadling covers Johnny Cash in English)

Anna + Idde
2005 – Anna + Idde (EP)
2006 – Vägar hem
2008 – Hjärtat fullt

Together with Karl-Magnus Fredriksson
2011 – Ögonblick och evighet

References

External links

1970 births
Living people
People from Sundsvall
Swedish guitarists
21st-century Swedish singers
21st-century Swedish women singers
21st-century guitarists
21st-century women guitarists